United Nations Security Council resolution 1227, adopted unanimously on 10 February 1999, after reaffirming resolutions 1177 (1998) and 1226 (1999) on the situation between Eritrea and Ethiopia, the Council demanded an immediate cessation of hostilities between the two countries.

In the preamble of the resolution, the Council expressed concern at the border conflict between Ethiopia and Eritrea, and recalled the commitment of both countries to a moratorium on the threat of and use of air strikes. It stressed that the current situation posed a threat to peace and security.

The Security Council condemned the resumption of hostilities by both countries and demanded an immediate halt to air strikes. Furthermore, it demanded that both countries resume diplomatic efforts towards a peaceful settlement of the conflict and noted that the Framework Agreement proposed by the Organisation of African Unity (OAU) remained a basis for a settlement. Eritrea later accepted the agreement.

The resolution concluded by requesting both Eritrea and Ethiopia to guarantee the safety of civilians and ensure respect for human rights and international humanitarian law and called upon all countries to immediately end the sale of weapons and ammunition to both countries.

See also
 Eritrean–Ethiopian War
 List of United Nations Security Council Resolutions 1201 to 1300 (1998–2000)
 United Nations Mission in Ethiopia and Eritrea

References

External links
 
Text of the Resolution at undocs.org

 1227
1999 in Eritrea
1999 in Ethiopia
 1227
 1227
Eritrea–Ethiopia border
February 1999 events